Helena Černohorská (born 18 January 1970) is a Czech biathlete. She competed in the women's sprint event at the 1992 Winter Olympics.

References

1970 births
Living people
Biathletes at the 1992 Winter Olympics
Czech female biathletes
Olympic biathletes of Czechoslovakia
Place of birth missing (living people)